Festival Flea Market Mall is an indoor flea market mall located in Pompano Beach, Florida. The established flea market used to be a Pompano outlet mall prior to its transformation into a flea market. Festival Flea Market Mall is now a private company established in 1991 and incorporated in Florida. Current estimates show this company employs a staff of approximately 50 to 99 employees.

The mall opened as Pompano Outlet Mall in 1986, and was put into foreclosure only two years after it opened. By 1989 the original outlet mall had closed entirely save for a movie theater. After a failed attempt to reopen it in 1990 under the name Broward Crossing, it was purchased by Shooster Properties and reopened in 1991 as a flea market mall.

Festival Flea Market Mall is located at 2900 West Sample Road, two miles west of I-95 at the Florida Turnpike. The mall itself is over a quarter-mile long and features over 800 stores with name brand merchandise at below outlet prices Festival receives visitors from all over the world and is housed in a 400,000 sq. ft. building that features booths and kiosks that sell designer jewelry, electronics, clothes, and shoes.

Location

Festival Flea Market Mall is located in Pompano Beach, Florida on Sample Road at the Florida Turnpike, Exit 69. It is located approximately 15 minutes from Fort Lauderdale and 30 minutes from Miami.  It is open Monday thru Friday from 9:30am – 5:00pm and Saturday & Sunday from 9:30am – 6:00pm.

Merchants

Festival Flea Market Mall includes over 500 retailers and merchants, operating booths (beginning at 144 sq. ft.), boutiques (up to 1,200 sq. ft.), specialty stores (1,200 - 2,000 sq. ft.), large stores (2,000+ sq.ft.), kiosks, pushcarts, and food court restaurants. The Festival Flea Market Mall has an open, multi-merchant flea market style layout. The large number of merchants offer a wide variety of products extending beyond typical flea market fare to include groceries, furniture, antiques and luggage.

See also
 Broward County, Florida
 List of largest shopping malls
 List of largest shopping malls in the United States

References

External links

Buildings and structures in Pompano Beach, Florida
Flea markets